Noeleen Mollison Scott (née Thomson; born 1927) is a former international lawn bowls competitor for New Zealand.

Bowls career
Scott won the triples and fours gold medals at the 1973 World Outdoor Bowls Championship in Wellington, New Zealand. She also won the gold medal in the team event (Taylor Trophy).

Scott won the New Zealand National Bowls Championships singles title in 1977, and was runner-up in 1965 and 1981. She was inducted into the Bowls New Zealand Hall of Fame in 2013.

References

1927 births
Living people
New Zealand female bowls players
Bowls World Champions